Peter John Stephens  (31 July 1912 in Chalfont St Peter, Buckinghamshire – 11 June 2002) was a writer of historical fiction books for teens and three children’s books. He was also a poet, a lyricist for operas and musicals, and a playwright.

His play, A Power of Dreams, was produced off-Broadway with Anne Meara of Stiller and Meara starred.

He died of prostate cancer in Streatham, London.

Works

Plays 
 Hugh of the Glen and his clogs are all one The Best One-Act Plays (1951-1952) 
 A Power of Dreams Off-Broadway Production

Children’s books 
 The Story of Fire Fighting, Harvey House, 1966
 Lillapig, Ernest Benn Limited, 1972
 Faster Than Anything, Ernest Benn Limited, 1974

Teen historical fiction books 
 The Outlaw King, Atheneum, 1964
 Perrely Plight, Atheneum, 1965
 Towappu, Atheneum, 1966
 Battle for Destiny, Atheneum, 1967
 Claim to the Wilderness, W. W. Norton & Company, 1967
 The Crime of Jairus Posey, Andre Deutsch, 1969
 The Thief-Takers, W. W. Norton & Company, 1970
 The Shadow over Welesmere Gap, Andre Deutsch, 1971
 The Rogue, George G. Harrap & Co, 1973
 A Shot from a Sling, Andre Deutsch, 1975

Opera Librettos (Composer Jan Meyerowitz)
 Simoon, Aug 2 1949 Tanglewood/Mass (from a Strindberg play)
 Godfather Death, June 1, 1961 New York; Conducted by Peter Paul Fuchs 1962

Family
His paternal great-great grandfather, Matthew Stephens, was a successful Welsh smuggler near Aberthaw in the Vale of Glamorgan.

He was the brother of Richard Waring, the US-based actor, and son of Thomas E. Stephens, whose portrait of Dwight D. Eisenhower hangs in the Smithsonian Gallery of Presidents and Evelyn Mary Waring. Retaining his British citizenship, Peter John wrote articles for the British Information Service, Rockefeller Center, New York City.

He was briefly married to the novelist, Henrietta Buckmaster, before Marcia Nichols Holden, a foster daughter of Harry Sidney Nichols, was a poet and editor. Her son from a previous marriage was Anton Holden, Emmy winning sound editor and the author of Prince Valium, Stein and Day, 1982 and Dolly Vardon, Boustrophedon Press, 2013. They had two children Dylan Stephens and Gillian Stephens, both musicians. Divorced in 1968 and moving to England, he married Eliane Falconi, an opera singer. Her children from a previous marriage were Guy Cremnitz, Monique Cremnitz, Christiane Sasportas, Noelle Sasportas, John Sasportas, Louis Sasportas, Marie Therese Sasportas.They had one child, Dilys Stephens, an artist.

References
 National Library of Wales – Llanmaes College – David Jones MSS, Ms 18507, Book 8, pp 321–323 (Matthew  Stephens, smuggler)
 The Best One-Act Plays, ed. Margaret Mayorga, New York, Dodd, Mead, 1937-1951/52)

1912 births
2002 deaths
Deaths from cancer in England
Deaths from prostate cancer
English children's writers
People from Chalfont St Peter
English male dramatists and playwrights
20th-century English dramatists and playwrights
20th-century English male writers